The terms Old Lights and New Lights (among others) are used in Protestant Christian circles to distinguish between two groups who were initially the same, but have come to a disagreement. These terms originated in the early 18th century from a split in theological approach among Calvinist denominations concerning the nature of conversion and salvation. Since then, they have been applied in a wide variety of ways, and the meaning must be determined from each context. Typically, if a denomination is changing, and some refuse to change, and the denomination splits, those who did not change are referred to as the  "Old Lights" and the ones who changed are referred to as the "New Lights".

History
The terms were first used during the First Great Awakening (1730s–40s), which expanded through the British North American colonies in the middle of the 18th century.  In A Faithful Narrative of the Surprising Work of God (1737), Jonathan Edwards, a leader in the Awakening, describes his congregants' vivid experiences with grace as causing a "new light" in their perspective on sin and atonement. Old Lights and New Lights generally referred to Congregationalists and Baptists in New England and  Presbyterians in Pennsylvania and further south. who took different positions on the Awakening from the traditional branches of their denominations. New Lights embraced the revivals that spread through the colonies, while Old Lights were suspicious of the revivals (and their seeming threat to authority). The historian Richard Bushman credits the division between Old Lights and New Lights for the creation of political factionalism in Connecticut in the mid-eighteenth century. Often many "new light" Congregationalists who had been converted under the preaching of George Whitefield left that connection to become "new light" Baptists when they found no evidence of infant baptism in the apostolic church. When told of this development, Whitefield famously quipped that he was glad to hear about the fervent faith of his followers but regretted that "so many of his chickens had become ducks." In the Presbyterian Church those elements embracing the revivals of the Great Awakening were sometimes called "New Side" and those opposed to the revivals were called "Old Side".

In the Church of Scotland in the 1790s the "Old Lights" followed the principles of the Covenanters, while the "New Lights" were more focused on personal salvation and considered the strictures of the Covenants as less binding moral enormities."

The terms were also used in 1833, when a debate over swearing allegiance to the US Constitution split the Reformed Presbyterians. The "Old Light" Reformed Presbyterians, in keeping with their Covenanter heritage, refused to swear allegiance to the constitution, and thus to become citizens, because the constitution made no mention of the Lordship of Christ, whereas the "New Light" Reformed Presbyterians allowed for it. Following the split, the Old Lights eventually formed the Reformed Presbyterian Church of North America and the New Lights formed the Reformed Presbyterian Church, General Synod.

See also
Anti-burgher movement in Scotland
Old Side–New Side controversy

References

18th-century Protestantism
19th-century Protestantism
Protestantism-related controversies
Reformed Presbyterian Church (denominational group)